George R. Griswold (December 31, 1794 – April 5, 1857) was an American politician and the tenth lieutenant governor of Michigan.

Early life
Griswold was born in the U.S. state of New York and later moved to Detroit, Michigan and practiced law.

Career
Griswold served as clerk of the first Michigan House of Representatives in 1835.  He was register of deeds from 1837 to 1841 and clerk of Wayne County from 1843 to 1847.  In 1839 he became owner and publisher of the Detroit Morning Post, and he became State Printer. He later served in the Michigan Senate from Detroit (1st District) from 1848 until 1849 and again in 1853 when he served as president pro tempore.
  
On March 8, 1853, Michigan Governor Robert McClelland resigned to become Secretary of the Interior under Franklin Pierce.  As a result,  Lieutenant Governor Andrew Parsons became Governor and Griswold became the tenth Lieutenant Governor and served from 1853 to 1854. On September 16 of that year he was appointed a purser in the U. S. Navy. He served as acting lieutenant governor until George Coe was elected and then took his place in January 1855.

Death

References

External links
 Political Graveyard
 

1857 deaths
1794 births
Lieutenant Governors of Michigan
Democratic Party Michigan state senators
Year of birth unknown
People who died at sea
19th-century American politicians
Griswold family